This is a list of electoral results for the Electoral district of Narrogin in Western Australian state elections.

Members for Narrogin

Election results

Elections in the 1980s

Elections in the 1970s 

Preferences were not distributed between the National Alliance and Liberal candidates for Narrogin.

Elections in the 1960s

References

Western Australian state electoral results by district